One Love, One Life is the fifteenth studio album by the Jamaican reggae singer Beres Hammond, released as a double album on 13 November 2012 by VP Records.
One Love, One Life consists of 20 songs and Hammond himself produced 19 out of 20  songs with various co-producers including Donovan Germain on "No Candle Light", Collin 'Bulby' York on "In My Arms", and Michael Fletcher on "More Time".  
The first disc, One Love features Hammond's distinctive classic lovers rock sounds, such as "No Candle Light", "In My Arms", and "Keep Me Warm". In contrast, the second disc concentrates on socially conscious and empowering tracks such as "You Stand Alone", "Truth Will Live On", and "Prime Time".

One Love, One Life was Hammond's first album in four years. In January 2014 it was nominated for a Grammy Award.

Track listing

Disc 1

Disc 2

Personnel

Beres Hammond - vocals, producer, writer, keyboard
Donovan Germain - writer, producer
Kirk Bennett - writer, drums, percussion
Steven Marsden - writer, keyboard
Aeion Hoilett - writer
Ranoy Gordon - writer
Michael Fletcher - writer, producer, bass, drum, guitar
Collin York - writer, producer, engineer
Robbie Lyn - writer, bass, keyboard
Dean Fraser - horn, saxophone
Devario Jones - engineer
Barry O'Hare - engineer
Aeion Hoilett - bass
Ranoy Gordon - guitar
Kevino "Bunu" Elliot - engineer
Steven Stanley - engineer
Howard Barrett - writer
Tyrone Evans - writer
John Holt - writer
Lowell "Sly" Dunbar - drum, percussion, writer
Robbie Shakespeare - bass
Winston "Bopee" Bowen - guitar
Lloyd "Obeah" Denton - keyboard, drum
Alvin Haughton - percussion
Cherine Anderson - background vocals
Shane Brown - engineer
Romel Marshall - engineer
Style Scott - drums
Errol "Flabba" Holt - bass, percussion
Robert Angus - guitar

Christopher Birch - keyboard
Michael Gayle - engineer
Mitchum "Khan" Chin - guitar
Dwight Dias - engineer
Cegrica 'Soljie" Hamilton - engineer
Trevor McKenzie - bass
Joshua Mannings - keyboard
Jimmy Peart - keyboard
Errol "Minimum" Graham - percussion
Errol Hird - saxophone
Samuel Grant - trumpet
Shaun Darson - drum
Robert Browne - guitar
Fabian Smith - keyboard
Dione Watt - background vocal
Dorrett Wisdom - background vocal
Carol "Bowie" McLaughlin - keyboard
Donald "Danny Bassie" Dennis - bass
Dalton Browne - guitar
Dwight Richards - trumpet
Kenyatta - engineer
Lloyd Parks - bass
Ivor "Willie" Lindon - guitar, writer
C. Manning - writer
Clement Dodd - writer
Nicola - background vocal
Samantha Strachan - vocal
Franklyn "Bubbler" Waul - keyboard
Handel Tucker - keyboard
Errol Brown - engineer

References

External links
 Check It Deeply: Overstanding Beres Hammond’s New Album by Large Up
 Beres Hammond Biography

2012 albums
Beres Hammond albums